The 2010 ConocoPhillips National Swimming Championships were held from August 3 until August 7, 2010 at the William Woollett Jr. Aquatics Center in Irvine, California.

Men's events

Women's events

External links
 Results at Omegatiming.com

Usa Swimming Championships, 2010
United States Swimming National Championships
Swimming competitions in the United States
S